The Merv Agars Medal is an award given by the Adelaide Advertiser to the player judged by journalists of the newspaper to the seasons best player from both the South Australian clubs competing in the Australian Football League (AFL),  and . Prior to the inclusion of South Australian teams in the AFL, the medal was awarded to the player judged by the Adelaide Advertiser journalists as the best in the South Australian National Football League.

References

Australian rules football awards